The following low-power television stations broadcast on digital or analog channel 48 in the United States:

 K48GV-D in Laketown, etc., Utah
 K48KJ-D in Geneva, Minnesota, to move to channel 21
 KHVM-LD in Minneapolis, Minnesota, to move to channel 18

The following television stations, which are no longer licensed, formerly broadcast on digital or analog channel 48 in the United States:
 K48AE in Woodland & Kamas, Utah
 K48BL in Terrebonne-Bend, etc., Oregon
 K48ED in Fillmore, etc., Utah
 K48EH in Tucumcari, New Mexico
 K48FG in Fairbanks, Alaska
 K48FZ in Ames, Iowa
 K48GI-D in Flagstaff, Arizona
 K48GX in Tucson, Arizona
 K48GY in Carrizozo, etc., New Mexico
 K48HU in Wichita Falls, Texas
 K48IJ-D in Preston, Idaho
 K48IQ in Billings, Montana
 K48JH-D in Capulin, etc., New Mexico
 K48KB in Chico, California
 K48LL-D in Kingsville-Alice, Texas
 K48LM in Carlin, Nevada
 K48MH-D in Roswell, New Mexico
 K48NU-D in Beaumont, Texas
 K48NY-D in Gainesville, Texas
 K48OQ-D in Lowry, South Dakota
 KDMK-LD in Lafayette, Louisiana
 KDPH-LP in Phoenix, Arizona
 KLBB-LP in Lubbock, Texas
 KNCV-LP in Carson City, etc., Nevada
 KOAZ-LP in O'Neill, Nebraska
 KROL-LP in Rolla, Missouri
 KTDO-LP in El Paso, Texas
 KTFA-LP in Albuquerque, New Mexico
 W48AO in Auburn, New York
 W48AV in Detroit, Michigan
 W48DT-D in Guayanilla, Puerto Rico
 WAZW-LP in Winchester, Virginia
 WLWN-LP in Sarasota, Florida
 WSSF-LP in Fayette, Alabama
 WSVL-LP in Keysville, Virginia

References

48 low-power TV stations in the United States